Jing Wang may refer to:

Wang Jing (disambiguation), a list of people with the surname Wang
King Jing (disambiguation), Zhou dynasty monarchs
Jing Wang (professor), professor of Chinese media and cultural studies